Governor Richardson may refer to:

Bill Richardson (born 1947), 30th Governor of New Mexico
Friend Richardson (1865–1943), 25th Governor of California
James Burchill Richardson (1770–1836), 41st Governor of South Carolina
John Peter Richardson II (1801–1864), 59th Governor of South Carolina
John Peter Richardson III (1831–1899), 83rd Governor of South Carolina, son of John Peter Richardson II.
William Alexander Richardson (1811–1875), 5th Governor of Nebraska Territory

See also
John Richardson (colonial administrator) (1679–1742), Deputy Governor of Anguilla from 1735 until 1741
William Richardson (colonial administrator) (fl. 1800s–1820s), Deputy Governor of Anguilla from 1805 until 1829